The Convent of Santa Isabel is a royal  monastery in central Madrid, Spain. Belonging to the  Augustine order of nuns founded by the wife of Philip III of Spain,  Margaret of Austria, it  is located near the Atocha Train Station. A school for girls there had been founded by Philip II. It was designed in the 18th century by  Gómez de Mora.

Starting from  April  1995 it has been  a "bien de interés cultural" and monument under the administration of the Patrimonio Nacional.

External links 
  Convent of Santa Isabel

References 

18th-century Roman Catholic church buildings in Spain
Santa Isabela
Santa Isabela
Convents in Spain